Paulo Stewart (born 20 May 1964) is a Brazilian equestrian. He competed in two events at the 1988 Summer Olympics.

References

External links
 

1964 births
Living people
Brazilian male equestrians
Olympic equestrians of Brazil
Equestrians at the 1988 Summer Olympics
Sportspeople from Rio de Janeiro (city)